Nyêmo is a county in the Lhasa west of the main center of Chengguan, Tibet. It lies on the north bank of the Yarlung Tsangpo River, the northern part of the Brahmaputra.

Location

"Nyemo" is the Tibetan word for "wheat". 
It is located in the middle section of the Brahmaputra,  from Lhasa.
The Nimu Maqu River flows through the county from north to south.  
The Yarlung Tsangpo River forms its southern boundary.

The county has a temperate semi-arid plateau monsoon climate, with about 100 frost-free days.
Nyêmo County mineral resources are copper, molybdenum and peat.
Wildlife includes leopards, bears, lynx, river deer, black-necked cranes, and pheasant.
Wild plants include Fritillaria, Cordyceps, berberine and lotus.

History

Nyêmo was the birthplace of the great translator Vairocana, and the place where the teacher Padmasambhava subjugated local spirits during his journey from Nepal to Lhasa. Old pre-Buddhist cults have survived into the modern era along with monasteries of the different Buddhist traditions.
The ala priestly tradition is a local hybrid of traditional religions and Buddhism that is distinctive of Nyemo.
Female mediums, possessed by spirits, performed healing ceremonies until the time of the Cultural Revolution.

In late 1968 a revolt in the rural areas of Tibet began in Nyêmo, caused by shortages of food and the chaos of the Cultural Revolution.
The revolt later spread to twenty more counties in the Tibet Autonomous Region.
In the 1969 "Nyemo incident" the followers of Nyêmo nun Trinley Chödrön combined with the forces of the Maoist Gyenlo party organization.  
Their “Army of the Gods” attacked government and army compounds and rival cadres throughout the region over the course of several weeks in June 1969.
Tinley Chodron, who was said to be an emanation of the holy bird Labja Gongmo from the Epic of King Gesar, was executed in Lhasa later that year.

Administrative divisions

Nyêmo County was established in 1959.
It includes the following towns or townships:

 Tarchong Town
 Toinba Township
 Xumai Township
 Pusum Township
 Paggor Township
 Margyang Township
 Karru Township
 Nyêmo Township

Climate

Economy

As of 2011 the total population was 30,844 people, of whom 28,474 were engaged in agriculture or herding.
In 2010 the per-capita net income of farmers and herdsmen was 4,854 yuan, while the disposable income of urban residents reached 14,381 yuan.
Total livestock was 167,800 excluding horses.
By 2012 the per capita income of farmers and herdsmen had reached 6,881 yuan.
In 2000, the county had 189 businesses with 3,319 production employees. 
Copper is mined in the county.

In the 7th century Nyêmo was producing printing materials, clay-based incense and wooden-sole shoes.
Nyêmo's long tradition of making paper and printing texts using woodblocks dates back to this period. 
Nyêmo County has China's first museum of Tibetan text.
Traditional paper continues to be manufactured in a village in Nyemo Town.
Other artisan products include incense and wood engraving for printing on paper and on prayer flags.
The processes of making Tibetan paper, incense and wood carvings are known as the "three unique skills of Nyemo."

Infrastructure

The county has 24 primary and secondary schools, including one junior high school, with a total staff of 260 people. 
There is a county hospital with 42 medical staff, eight rural health centers and 26 village clinics with 71 medical personnel. 
There is a county television station.
A small hydropower power plant with a capacity of 250 kilowatts produces 257,000 kilowatt hours annually. 
The Friendship Highway (part of China National Highway 318) passes through Nyêmo County on the section between Lhasa and Shigatse.

There are 22 temples, of which fourteen are male monasteries and eight are nunneries. 
As of 2011 there were 118 monks and 99 nuns.
The Nyêmo Chekar monastery is known for its 16th century murals depicting reincarnations of the Samding Dorje Phagmo.
At Jieji Monastery the lamas make elaborate mandalas using pieces of woodcarving and hand-made embroidery.
The art form was brought from India to Tibet in the 11th century.

References

Sources

 
Counties of Tibet